Rob Ruijgh (born 12 November 1986) is a Dutch former professional racing cyclist.

Career

Amateur career
Ruijgh was born in Heerlen, and liked to watch cycling on television as a youth. After visiting the local velodrome in Geleen, he started racing at the age of 9. In 1998, he became Dutch Youth Champion for 12-year-olds in Oldenzaal. With continued good results, he came into the picture of the former Dutch national coach Egon van Kessel. As he became older, van Kessel invited Ruijgh to compete against foreign opponents of his age, which are also among the best in their country. Ruijgh did not disappoint, winning the highly regarded World Cup Giro della Lunigiana in 2004. Shortly after that he also rode the Men's Junior World Championships in Verona, Italy.

In 2005, Ruijgh rode for Belgian team Amuzza.com, where former top sprinter Wilfried Nelissen was his team leader. Due to a virus, he could not keep up his good results, which took him out for a few months. In 2008 Ruijgh joined the German Team Sparkasse; hestarted to perform well again and rode for the Dutch national team at under-23 level. In 2009 he continued his good results at Team BPL–Belisol, where he won Romsée–Stavelot–Romsée and the 1st stage of the Tour de Liège. Thereafter, team manager Daan Luijkx from the  offered him an internship in mid-2009. He finished in eleventh place at the Tour of Britain.

Professional career
After the internship in mid-2009, he became a professional with the  team in 2010, signing a contract until the end of 2011. He made his debut in the Tour of Qatar. After the Dutch National Road Race Championships in Beek, he broke his hand while training behind a scooter. The rest of the year he finished in the top 10 five times with a 3rd place in Binche–Tournai–Binche.

In 2011, Ruijgh had a great year; he helped team-mate Pim Ligthart win the Dutch National Road Race Championships in Ootmarsum, finishing 6th himself. He also had a strong performance in the Critérium du Dauphiné, ending 14th in the general classification. After these results Ruijgh made his debut in the Tour de France and made it to Paris. He made an excellent impression as the best Dutch cyclist, finishing 21st in the general classification – 33 minutes, 4 seconds behind winner Cadel Evans – and 5th in the young riders classification. During the Tour de France, he extended his contract with  until the end of the 2013 season.

In 2012 he missed the Tour de France because of a knee injury and also had to quit the Vuelta a España; tests diagnosed a parasite in his stomach. 2013 also did not start well for Ruijgh as during his favoured home race, the Amstel Gold Race, he fell and suffered a concussion. Recovery from the crash took longer than expected because of a fever after Liège–Bastogne–Liège. By the end of April his health and condition were back to normal and in May Ruijgh finished 54th overall at the Giro d'Italia.

Ruijgh joined  for the 2014 season, after  folded at the end of the 2013 season.

Major results

2005
 1st ITT OZ Wielerweekend
 3th Overall GC OZ Wielerweekend
 6th Flèche Ardennaise
2006
 6th Overall Triptyque des Barrages
2008
 7th Overall Tour des Pyrénées
2009
 5th Druivenkoers Overijse
2010
 3rd Binche–Tournai–Binche
2011
 4th Overall Four Days of Dunkirk
 7th Grand Prix de Plumelec-Morbihan
 1st Ridderronde Maastricht
2012
 1st RaboRonde Heerlen
 9th Overall Four Days of Dunkirk
 10th Grand Prix de Plumelec-Morbihan
2014
 1st Memorial Van Coningsloo
 9th Overall Three Days of De Panne
2015
 9th Druivenkoers Overijse
2017
 1st Overall Tour of Iran (Azerbaijan)
 10th Volta Limburg Classic

References

External links

1986 births
Living people
Dutch male cyclists
Sportspeople from Heerlen
UCI Road World Championships cyclists for the Netherlands
Cyclists from Limburg (Netherlands)
Tour of Azerbaijan (Iran) winners
21st-century Dutch people